Cloy or CLOY may refer to:

 Cloy, County Fermanagh, a townland in Ireland
 Cloy, Wrexham, a location in Wales
 Crash Landing on You (CLOY), a South Korean TV drama series
 George Cloy, Scottish footballer
 Cloy Mattox, baseball player